Veronica obtusata, the northern hebe, is a flowering plant belonging to the family Plantaginaceae. It is native to northern New Zealand, and was first described by Thomas Cheeseman in 1916.

Description

Veronica obtusata is a sprawling shrub with paired dark green leaves. It looks similar to Veronica bishopiana, however tends to grow smaller and does not share the maroon-green leaves of Veronica bishopiana.

Taxonomy

The plant was first identified as Veronica macroura var. dubia by Thomas Cheeseman in 1916, later recategorised as Hebe obtusata in 1926 by Cockayne & Allan. More recently, the plant was recategorised as a species of veronica.

Distribution

Veronica bishopiana is naturally distributed in the coastal areas of the Waitākere Ranges of West Auckland, and the Kawhia and Whaingaroa harbours of the western Waikato region. The populations in the Kawhia Harbour are threatened. Veronica obtusata is typically found on steep slopes and banks, on cliff faces and rock stacks.

References

obtusata
Endemic flora of New Zealand
Plants described in 1916
Taxa named by Thomas Frederic Cheeseman